Sándor Csernus (born 21 March 1950) is a Hungarian historian, associate professor (docent, reader), diplomat, former dean of Faculty of Arts, University of Szeged and director of the Hungarian Institute of Paris. He is fluent in Hungarian and French.

Biography and carrier
Sándor Csernus was born on 21 March 1950 in Algyő.
He took M. A. degrees at the Attila József University, Faculty of Arts in French and History in 1975.

Committee Memberships
SZÁZADOK (Member of the Scientific Redaction − since 2017
dean of Faculty of Arts, University of Szeged − 2008÷2014                          
Council of the Regional Centre of the Hungarian Academy of Sciences (member) and President of Commission (Szeged) ÷ since 2014
Director for International Relations, Balassi Institute (Budapest) − 2006−2008	
Responsible for the Center of European Studies (PHARE programme) − 1997−1999	
Coordinator of the international cooperation of the University of Szeged − 1994−1999	
Founding member, Alliance Française of Szeged, (2007−2017, President) − since 1994
Member of the editorial staff of the “Cahier d’Etudes Hongroises” (Co-editor since 1999) − 1990−2005	
Member of a dozen of national and international scientific societies and associations (history, philology, e.g. International *Society for Hungarian Philology, Hungarian Society for Medieval Studies, Society of Travel Studies) − since 1985 
Translation of French texts of the Middle Ages and about the Middle Ages (e.g. Robert de Clari, Joinville, Philippe de Commynes) − since 1981 
Writing of cartoon scenarios, contribution to the filming of documentaries on history − since 1979 
Organisation of symposiums on the national and international levels Participation to about thirty symposiums in Hungary and abroad − since 1975 
Preparation and writing of bibliographies, lists of sources, translations − since 1975 
Project manager in the Tempus, Phare and Socrates programmes dealing with the modernisation of higher education − 1996−1999	
Various academic responsibilities (Chief of Department, Vice-director of the Institute of History, member of the Senate) − 1979−1999	
Co-founder and chief editor of the history review “AETAS” ÷ 1973−1981

Awards and honors
Knight in the Order of Academic Palms (French decoration) − 1998	
Officer in the Order of Arts and Letters (French decoration) − 2001	
Officer in the National Order of Merit (French decoration) − 2001	
Pro Urbe Szeged − 2002	
Cross of Knight in the Hungarian Order of Merit − 2006	
 Knight in the Order of Legion of Honour (French decoration) − 2011

References

Bibliography

Selected works

Papers
Csernus, Sándor: From the Arsenal of Sigismund’s Diplomacy: Universalism versus Sovereignty, In: Bárány, Attila Pál (ed.): Das Konzil von Konstanz und Ungarn. Debrecen: MTA, 2016. pp. 9−32. = Memoria Hungariae; 1.)
Csernus, Sándor: La Hongrie de Mathias Corvin, In: Jean-François Maillard, István Monok, Donatella Nebbiai (eds.): Matthias Corvin, les bibliothèques princières et la genèse de l’état moderne. Budapest: Országos Széchényi Könyvtár (OSZK), 2009. pp. 13–24. = Supplementum Corvinianum; 2.)
Csernus, Sándor: La Hongrie des Anjou, In: Guy Le Goff, Francesco Aceto (eds.): L'Europe des Anjou: Aventure des princes angevins du XIIIe au XVe siécle. Paris: Somogy éditions d'art, 2001. pp. 154–168.
Csernus, Sándor: La Hongrie et les Hongrois dans la littérature chevaleresque française, In: Coulet, N (ed.): La noblesse dans les territoires angevins à la fin du Moyen Age: actes du colloque international : Angers-Saumur, 3-4 juin 1998. Roma: École Francaise de Rome, 2000. pp. 717–735. = Collection de l'École Francaise de Rome; 275.)
Csernus, Sándor: Les Hongrie, les Français et les premières croisades, In: Sándor Csernus, Klára Korompay (eds.): Les Hongrois et l'Europe: Conquête et intégration. Paris; Szeged: Institut Hongrois de Paris; JATE, 1999. pp. 411–426. = Publications de l'Institut hongrois de Paris

Books

External links 

 
 

1950 births
Academic staff of the University of Szeged
20th-century Hungarian historians
Chevaliers of the Ordre des Palmes Académiques
Living people
Officiers of the Ordre des Arts et des Lettres
Officers of the Ordre national du Mérite
Chevaliers of the Légion d'honneur
21st-century Hungarian historians